The Earlybirds are a band from New Zealand. Their debut album, Favourite Fears, was released on 23 August 2010 and entered the New Zealand album charts at number seven, spending three weeks on the chart.

Discography

Studio albums

Singles

Members-

Filip Kostovich – Vocals/Keyboards

Mike Cannon – Guitar

Jared Aisher – Bass

Sean Patterson – Drums

Kane ter Veer – Guitar/Backing Vocals

References

The Earlybirds – Favourite Fears – Album Booklet.

External links
 The Earlybirds web page

New Zealand musical groups